Sidimane "Sidy" Sagna (born 4 February 1990) is a Senegalese professional footballer who plays as a defensive midfielder for Moldovan club Sfântul Gheorghe.

Career
Sagna was born in Dakar, Senegal. He began his career with ASC Yeggo and joined in January 2009 to Ligue 1 side AS Saint-Étienne's reserve team. On 31 May 2010, he signed a professional contract with Saint-Étienne until 30 June 2011. He played for Saint Etienne reserves during season 2011–12 and 2012–13, until signing a professional contract at Norwegian club Sogndal in January 2013. He was released after the 2013 season. In October 2019 he joined Lithuanian club FK Panevėžys.

Career statistics

References

External links
 
 

1990 births
Living people
Senegalese footballers
Association football midfielders
Senegalese expatriate footballers
Expatriate footballers in France
Senegalese expatriate sportspeople in France
Expatriate footballers in Norway
Senegalese expatriate sportspeople in Norway
Expatriate footballers in Greece
Senegalese expatriate sportspeople in Greece
Expatriate footballers in Portugal
Senegalese expatriate sportspeople in Portugal
Expatriate footballers in Georgia (country)
Senegalese expatriate sportspeople in Georgia (country)
Expatriate footballers in Lithuania
Senegalese expatriate sportspeople in Lithuania
Expatriate footballers in Moldova
Senegalese expatriate sportspeople in Moldova
Championnat National 2 players
Ligue 1 players
Eliteserien players
Championnat National 3 players
Liga Portugal 2 players
Erovnuli Liga players
A Lyga players
Moldovan Super Liga players
AS Saint-Étienne players
Sogndal Fotball players
Aris Thessaloniki F.C. players
US Roye-Noyon players
C.F. União players
FC Samtredia players
FK Panevėžys players
FC Sfîntul Gheorghe players